Borlang is a village development committee in northern-central Nepal. As of the 1991 Nepal census it had a population of 4,737 and had 837 houses.

Education 
1. Shree Saraswoti Secondary School, Borlang was established in 2016 BS.
2. Patan Devi Secondary School, Cyamuntar was established in 2020 BS.
3. Shree Jageshwar Secondary School, Mahadevtar was established in 2032 BS.
4. Ravindra Jyoti Primary school, Pipaltar was established in 2035 BS. 
5. Laxmi Jyoti Primary school, Narayanpur.
6. Bhimsen primary school, Amala Bhanjyang
7. Ghatbesi primary school, Ghatbesi. 
8. Sundar Basic School, Simaltar.

Notables

Mathabarsingh Thapa, Prime Minister of Nepal
Jung Bahadur Rana, Prime Minister of Nepal
Bal Narsingh Kunwar
Bhimsen Thapa, first prime minister of nepal born

References

According to the latest census of CBS Borlang VDC has 1179 households with total population of 5044. Similarly, male/female population is 2281/2763.

Populated places in Gorkha District